Shah Veysabad (also Romanized as Shāh Veysābād) is a village in Horr Rural District, Dinavar District, Sahneh County, Kermanshah Province, Iran. At the 2006 census, its population was 181, in 44 families.

References 

Populated places in Sahneh County